Cristín Yorleny Granados Gómez (born 19 August 1989) is a Costa Rican footballer who plays as a midfielder for AD Moravia and the Costa Rica women's national team.

Honours 
Costa Rica
Winner
 Central American Games: 2013

References

External links
 Cristín Granados at AupaAthletic.com 
 
 Profile  at Fedefutbol
 

1989 births
Living people
Women's association football midfielders
Costa Rican women's footballers
People from Cartago Province
Costa Rica women's international footballers
2015 FIFA Women's World Cup players
Central American Games gold medalists for Costa Rica
Central American Games medalists in football
Footballers at the 2015 Pan American Games
VCU Rams women's soccer players
South Florida Bulls women's soccer players
Real Madrid Femenino players
Costa Rican expatriate footballers
Costa Rican expatriate sportspeople in the United States
Expatriate women's soccer players in the United States
Costa Rican expatriate sportspeople in Colombia
Expatriate women's footballers in Colombia
Costa Rican expatriate sportspeople in Spain
Expatriate women's footballers in Spain
Pan American Games competitors for Costa Rica